Bárbara Torres (born May 9, 1975, in Mar del Plata) is an Argentine television, theatre and film actress best known for her roles in Hospital El Paisa, VidaTV, and as "Exelsa" in La familia P. Luche.

Filmography
 Lorenza (TV series) (2019–2020) Lorenza
 Papá a toda madre (2017-2018) Gladis
 Enamorándome de Ramón (2017) Luisa
 Despertar contigo (2016)
 Como dice el dicho (2015) Dora
 Esperanza del corazón (2011-2012) TV series
 La rosa de Guadalupe (2010)
 Niña de mi corazón (2010) Florencia
 Humor a quien humor merece (2010) TV series
 Desmadruga2 (2009) TV series
 Adictos (2009) TV series
 Qué tarde tan padre (2008) TV series
 Muévete (2006) La bruja Carmela
 Vida TV (2004-2005) La bruja Carmela
 Hospital El Paisa (2004) Evita Dolores Sobando
 La Familia P.Luche (2002-2012) Excelsa

References

External links

Argentine television actresses
Living people
Argentine emigrants to Mexico
Argentine women comedians
Naturalized citizens of Mexico
1975 births
People from Mar del Plata